Francesco Bernardi may refer to:

Senesino (1686–1758), Italian castrato singer
Francesco Bernardi (painter), 17th century Veronese painter